Borisovo is the name of several  rural localities in Russia.

Altai Krai
As of 2010, one rural locality in Altai Krai bears this name:
Borisovo, Altai Krai, a selo in Borisovsky Selsoviet of Zalesovsky District

Amur Oblast
As of 2010, one rural locality in Amur Oblast bears this name:
Borisovo, Amur Oblast, a selo in Romanovsky Rural Settlement of Oktyabrsky District

Republic of Bashkortostan
As of 2010, one rural locality in the Republic of Bashkortostan bears this name:
Borisovo, Republic of Bashkortostan, a village in Gusevsky Selsoviet of Abzelilovsky District

Belgorod Oblast
As of 2010, one rural locality in Belgorod Oblast bears this name:
Borisovo, Belgorod Oblast, a selo in Nasonovsky Rural Okrug of Valuysky District

Bryansk Oblast
As of 2010, one rural locality in Bryansk Oblast bears this name:
Borisovo, Bryansk Oblast, a selo in Pushkinsky Selsoviet of Sevsky District

Irkutsk Oblast
As of 2010, one rural locality in Irkutsk Oblast bears this name:
Borisovo, Irkutsk Oblast, a selo in Tayshetsky District

Ivanovo Oblast
As of 2010, two rural localities in Ivanovo Oblast bear this name:
Borisovo, Pestyakovsky District, Ivanovo Oblast, a village in Pestyakovsky District
Borisovo, Puchezhsky District, Ivanovo Oblast, a village in Puchezhsky District

Kaluga Oblast
As of 2010, two rural localities in Kaluga Oblast bear this name:
Borisovo, Borovsky District, Kaluga Oblast, a village in Borovsky District
Borisovo, Meshchovsky District, Kaluga Oblast, a village in Meshchovsky District

Kemerovo Oblast
As of 2010, one rural locality in Kemerovo Oblast bears this name:
Borisovo, Kemerovo Oblast, a selo in Borisovskaya Rural Territory of Krapivinsky District

Kostroma Oblast
As of 2010, three rural localities in Kostroma Oblast bear this name:
Borisovo, Chukhlomsky District, Kostroma Oblast, a village in Pankratovskoye Settlement of Chukhlomsky District
Borisovo, Kadyysky District, Kostroma Oblast, a village in Yekaterinkinskoye Settlement of Kadyysky District
Borisovo, Neysky District, Kostroma Oblast, a village in Vozherovskoye Settlement of Neysky District

Leningrad Oblast
As of 2010, three rural localities in Leningrad Oblast bear this name:
Borisovo, Boksitogorsky District, Leningrad Oblast, a village in Bolshedvorskoye Settlement Municipal Formation of Boksitogorsky District
Borisovo, Gatchinsky District, Leningrad Oblast, a village under the administrative jurisdiction of Vyritskoye Settlement Municipal Formation of Gatchinsky District
Borisovo, Priozersky District, Leningrad Oblast, a village in Razdolyevskoye Settlement Municipal Formation of Priozersky District

Moscow Oblast
As of 2010, eight rural localities in Moscow Oblast bear this name:
Borisovo, Domodedovo, Moscow Oblast, a village under the administrative jurisdiction of the Domodedovo Town Under Oblast Jurisdiction
Borisovo, Dmitrovsky District, Moscow Oblast, a selo under the administrative jurisdiction of the Town of Dmitrov in Dmitrovsky District
Borisovo, Klinsky District, Moscow Oblast, a village under the administrative jurisdiction of the Town of Klin in Klinsky District
Borisovo, Kolomensky District, Moscow Oblast, a village in Nepetsinskoye Rural Settlement of Kolomensky District
Borisovo, Mozhaysky District, Moscow Oblast, a selo in Borisovskoye Rural Settlement of Mozhaysky District
Borisovo, Pavlovo-Posadsky District, Moscow Oblast, a village in Kuznetsovskoye Rural Settlement of Pavlovo-Posadsky District
Borisovo, Sergiyevo-Posadsky District, Moscow Oblast, a village under the administrative jurisdiction of the work settlement of Bogorodskoye in Sergiyevo-Posadsky District
Borisovo, Serpukhovsky District, Moscow Oblast, a village in Dankovskoye Rural Settlement of Serpukhovsky District

Nizhny Novgorod Oblast
As of 2010, one rural locality in Nizhny Novgorod Oblast bears this name:
Borisovo, Nizhny Novgorod Oblast, a village in Lindovsky Selsoviet of the town of oblast significance of Bor

Novgorod Oblast
As of 2010, eight rural localities in Novgorod Oblast bear this name:
Borisovo, Krasnoborskoye Settlement, Kholmsky District, Novgorod Oblast, a village in Krasnoborskoye Settlement of Kholmsky District
Borisovo, Togodskoye Settlement, Kholmsky District, Novgorod Oblast, a village in Togodskoye Settlement of Kholmsky District
Borisovo, Krestetsky District, Novgorod Oblast, a village in Novorakhinskoye Settlement of Krestetsky District
Borisovo, Maryovsky District, Novgorod Oblast, a village in Moiseyevskoye Settlement of Maryovsky District
Borisovo, Moshenskoy District, Novgorod Oblast, a village in Kirovskoye Settlement of Moshenskoy District
Borisovo, Pestovsky District, Novgorod Oblast, a village in Pestovskoye Settlement of Pestovsky District
Borisovo, Starorussky District, Novgorod Oblast, a village in Nagovskoye Settlement of Starorussky District
Borisovo, Valdaysky District, Novgorod Oblast, a village in Roshchinskoye Settlement of Valdaysky District

Perm Krai
As of 2010, two rural localities in Perm Krai bear this name:
Borisovo, Chusovoy, Perm Krai, a village under the administrative jurisdiction of the town of krai significance of Chusovoy
Borisovo, Ilyinsky District, Perm Krai, a village in Ilyinsky District

Pskov Oblast
As of 2010, eight rural localities in Pskov Oblast bear this name:
Borisovo, Dedovichsky District, Pskov Oblast, a village in Dedovichsky District
Borisovo, Krasnogorodsky District, Pskov Oblast, a village in Krasnogorodsky District
Borisovo, Nevelsky District, Pskov Oblast, a village in Nevelsky District
Borisovo (Runovskaya Rural Settlement), Novosokolnichesky District, Pskov Oblast, a village in Novosokolnichesky District; municipally, a part of Runovskaya Rural Settlement of that district
Borisovo (Gorozhanskaya Rural Settlement), Novosokolnichesky District, Pskov Oblast, a village in Novosokolnichesky District; municipally, a part of Gorozhanskaya Rural Settlement of that district
Borisovo (Mayevskaya Rural Settlement), Novosokolnichesky District, Pskov Oblast, a village in Novosokolnichesky District; municipally, a part of Mayevskaya Rural Settlement of that district
Borisovo, Opochetsky District, Pskov Oblast, a village in Opochetsky District
Borisovo, Porkhovsky District, Pskov Oblast, a village in Porkhovsky District

Ryazan Oblast
As of 2010, one rural locality in Ryazan Oblast bears this name:
Borisovo, Ryazan Oblast, a village in Zadne-Pilevsky Rural Okrug of Klepikovsky District

Smolensk Oblast
As of 2010, one rural locality in Smolensk Oblast bears this name:
Borisovo, Smolensk Oblast, a village in Pigulinskoye Rural Settlement of Kholm-Zhirkovsky District

Tula Oblast
As of 2010, four rural localities in Tula Oblast bear this name:
Borisovo, Aleksinsky District, Tula Oblast, a village in Borisovsky Rural Okrug of Aleksinsky District
Borisovo, Leninsky District, Tula Oblast, a village in Zaytsevsky Rural Okrug of Leninsky District
Borisovo, Suvorovsky District, Tula Oblast, a village in Zyabrevskaya Rural Territory of Suvorovsky District
Borisovo, Yasnogorsky District, Tula Oblast, a village in Klimovskaya Rural Territory of Yasnogorsky District

Tver Oblast
As of 2010, nine rural localities in Tver Oblast bear this name:
Borisovo, Kalininsky District, Tver Oblast, a village in Kalininsky District
Borisovo, Kimrsky District, Tver Oblast, a village in Kimrsky District
Borisovo, Kuvshinovsky District, Tver Oblast, a village in Kuvshinovsky District
Borisovo, Nelidovsky District, Tver Oblast, a village in Nelidovsky District
Borisovo (Itomlya Rural Settlement), Rzhevsky District, Tver Oblast, a village in Rzhevsky District; municipally, a part of Itomlya Rural Settlement of that district
Borisovo (Pobeda Rural Settlement), Rzhevsky District, Tver Oblast, a village in Rzhevsky District; municipally, a part of Pobeda Rural Settlement of that district
Borisovo (Yeletskoye Rural Settlement), Selizharovsky District, Tver Oblast, a village in Selizharovsky District; municipally, a part of Yeletskoye Rural Settlement of that district
Borisovo (Okovetskoye Rural Settlement), Selizharovsky District, Tver Oblast, a village in Selizharovsky District; municipally, a part of Okovetskoye Rural Settlement of that district
Borisovo, Staritsky District, Tver Oblast, a village in Staritsky District

Udmurt Republic
As of 2010, one rural locality in the Udmurt Republic bears this name:
Borisovo, Udmurt Republic, a village in Sigayevsky Selsoviet of Sarapulsky District

Vladimir Oblast
As of 2010, three rural localities in Vladimir Oblast bear this name:
Borisovo (Grigoryevskoye Rural Settlement), Gus-Khrustalny District, Vladimir Oblast, a village in Gus-Khrustalny District; municipally, a part of Grigoryevskoye Rural Settlement of that district
Borisovo (Zolotkovo Rural Settlement), Gus-Khrustalny District, Vladimir Oblast, a village in Gus-Khrustalny District; municipally, a part of Zolotkovo Rural Settlement of that district
Borisovo, Muromsky District, Vladimir Oblast, a selo in Muromsky District

Vologda Oblast
As of 2010, fourteen rural localities in Vologda Oblast bear this name:
Borisovo, Babushkinsky District, Vologda Oblast, a village in Bereznikovsky Selsoviet of Babushkinsky District
Borisovo, Chagodoshchensky District, Vologda Oblast, a settlement in Borisovsky Selsoviet of Chagodoshchensky District
Borisovo, Irdomatsky Selsoviet, Cherepovetsky District, Vologda Oblast, a village in Irdomatsky Selsoviet of Cherepovetsky District
Borisovo, Yargomzhsky Selsoviet, Cherepovetsky District, Vologda Oblast, a village in Yargomzhsky Selsoviet of Cherepovetsky District
Borisovo, Kaduysky District, Vologda Oblast, a village in Andronovsky Selsoviet of Kaduysky District
Borisovo, Churovsky Selsoviet, Sheksninsky District, Vologda Oblast, a village in Churovsky Selsoviet of Sheksninsky District
Borisovo, Yeremeyevsky Selsoviet, Sheksninsky District, Vologda Oblast, a village in Yeremeyevsky Selsoviet of Sheksninsky District
Borisovo, Sokolsky District, Vologda Oblast, a village in Chuchkovsky Selsoviet of Sokolsky District
Borisovo, Vashkinsky District, Vologda Oblast, a village in Andreyevsky Selsoviet of Vashkinsky District
Borisovo, Borisovsky Selsoviet, Vologodsky District, Vologda Oblast, a village in Borisovsky Selsoviet of Vologodsky District
Borisovo, Priluksky Selsoviet, Vologodsky District, Vologda Oblast, a village in Priluksky Selsoviet of Vologodsky District
Borisovo, Vozhegodsky District, Vologda Oblast, a village in Lipino-Kalikinsky Selsoviet of Vozhegodsky District
Borisovo, Ankhimovsky Selsoviet, Vytegorsky District, Vologda Oblast, a village in Ankhimovsky Selsoviet of Vytegorsky District
Borisovo, Kemsky Selsoviet, Vytegorsky District, Vologda Oblast, a village in Kemsky Selsoviet of Vytegorsky District

Yaroslavl Oblast
As of 2010, ten rural localities in Yaroslavl Oblast bear this name:
Borisovo, Bolsheselsky District, Yaroslavl Oblast, a village in Bolsheselsky Rural Okrug of Bolsheselsky District
Borisovo, Danilovsky District, Yaroslavl Oblast, a village in Semivragovsky Rural Okrug of Danilovsky District
Borisovo, Stavotinsky Rural Okrug, Gavrilov-Yamsky District, Yaroslavl Oblast, a village in Stavotinsky Rural Okrug of Gavrilov-Yamsky District
Borisovo, Zayachye-Kholmsky Rural Okrug, Gavrilov-Yamsky District, Yaroslavl Oblast, a village in Zayachye-Kholmsky Rural Okrug of Gavrilov-Yamsky District
Borisovo, Nekrasovsky District, Yaroslavl Oblast, a village in Grebovsky Rural Okrug of Nekrasovsky District
Borisovo, Glebovsky Rural Okrug, Pereslavsky District, Yaroslavl Oblast, a village in Glebovsky Rural Okrug of Pereslavsky District
Borisovo, Lyubimtsevsky Rural Okrug, Pereslavsky District, Yaroslavl Oblast, a village in Lyubimtsevsky Rural Okrug of Pereslavsky District
Borisovo, Tutayevsky District, Yaroslavl Oblast, a village in Rodionovsky Rural Okrug of Tutayevsky District
Borisovo, Kuznechikhinsky Rural Okrug, Yaroslavsky District, Yaroslavl Oblast, a village in Kuznechikhinsky Rural Okrug of Yaroslavsky District
Borisovo, Teleginsky Rural Okrug, Yaroslavsky District, Yaroslavl Oblast, a village in Teleginsky Rural Okrug of Yaroslavsky District